The Mittlerer Ladungsträger Springer (Sd.Kfz. 304) was a demolition vehicle of the German Wehrmacht in World War II.

Description 
Based on the NSU Sd.Kfz. 2 Kettenkrad light tracked vehicle, NSU Werke at Neckarsulm developed and built around 50 Springer demolition vehicles in the final year of World War II.

To make the vehicle capable of carrying a bigger payload without the motorcycle-style front fork of the original, two pairs of overlapping and interleaved road wheels were added to the aft end of the running gear on each side; giving three outer and three inner running wheels. It was powered by the same Opel Olympia engine of the Kettenkrad.

The Springer was a demolition vehicle. Its task was to carry a charge of 330  kg (728 lbs) high explosives under armor protection towards a target and detonate it there.

A driver, sitting in the back of the Springer, drove the vehicle close to the target before dismounting. The final approach and the detonation of the charge was controlled by a wired or wireless remote control device.

Springers were operated by "Radio Control Armoured Companies", a company made up of three Sturmgeschütz 40 armoured control vehicles, each controlling three Springers and a Sturmgeschütz command vehicle.

The Springer showed the same problems as other remote-controlled demolition vehicles: They were expensive and not very reliable. As the explosive charge was an integral part of the vehicle, it could be used only once.

Survivors

An NSU Springer is displayed at The Tank Museum, UK. Another example is preserved at the MM PARK near Strasbourg, in France.

See also
 Goliath tracked mine
 Borgward IV
 Mobile Land Mine
 Teletank

References

 Jaugitz, Markus: Die deutsche Fernlenktruppe 1940–1943. Waffen-Arsenal Special Volume 10, 1994, Podzun-Pallas-Publishers, Germany
Sd Kfz 304 Mittlerer Ladungsträger (E1951.48) Tank Museum

World War II vehicles of Germany
Research and development in Nazi Germany
Military robots
Robots of Germany
Tracked robots
1940s robots
Military vehicles introduced from 1940 to 1944
Military vehicles of Germany